The Presidential Car Museum is a museum within the Quezon Memorial Circle in Quezon City, Metro Manila, Philippines. The museum displays cars used by the former Philippine Presidents.

History
The National Historical Commission of the Philippines was planning to open a museum to house the presidential cars of former Philippine Presidents as early as 2013.

The NHCP secured a location for the museum when it signed a memorandum of agreement with the local government of Quezon City. The city provided at least  of space for the museum. The land within the Quezon Memorial Circle where the museum was built was formerly occupied by basketball and volleyball courts which was moved to another part of the park at the NHCP's expense.

The museum was formally inaugurated on August 19, 2018.

Collection
The museum displays the National Historical Commission of the Philippines collection of cars used by former Presidents of the Philippines during their term of office, restored to their original condition. Prior to the opening of the museum, the vehicles were housed in a private warehouse in Pampanga.

 1924 Packard Single Six Touring Model 233 used by President Emilio Aguinaldo.
 In service: 1924–1964

 1937 Chrysler Airflow Custom Imperial CW used by President Manuel L. Quezon.
 In service: 1937-1941

 1941 Packard 180 used by President José P. Laurel and President Sergio Osmeña.
 In service: 1941–1946

 1940 Cadillac Fleetwood Series 75 used by President Manuel Róxas.
 In service: 1946–1948

 1953 Chrysler Crown Imperial used by President Elpidio Quirino.
 In service: 1948–1953

 1955 Cadillac Series 75-23 Fleetwood used by President Ramón Magsaysay.
 In service: 1953–1957

 1959 Cadillac de Ville similar to the one used by President Diosdado Macapagal.
 In service: 1961–1965

 1980 Lincoln Continental Mark VI used by President Ferdinand Marcos.
 In service: 1980–1986

 Mercedes-Benz 500 SEL used by President Corazon Aquino.
 In service: 1986–1992

 Mercedes-Benz 500 SEL Guard used by President Fidel V. Ramos.
 In service: 1986–1992

 Mercedes-Benz S600 used by President Joseph Estrada.
 In service: 1993–2001

 Mercedes-Benz S600 (LWB) used by President Gloria Macapagal Arroyo.
 In service: 1993–2001

Other vehicles:

 1935 Cadillac V-16 used by President Manuel Quezon as his presidential car and soon turned over to General Douglas MacArthur in 1937.
 In service: 1935–1936

1943 Willy's Jeep donated by General Douglas MacArthur and used by Ramón Magsaysay during his tenure as Secretary of National Defense.
 In service: 1950–1953

 1960 Rolls-Royce Phantom V owned by Imelda Marcos.
 In service: 1965–1986

 a kalesa owned by the family of León Apacible, a member of the commission that drafted the Malolos Constitution.

References

Museums in Quezon City
History museums in the Philippines